Gottlieb Jakob Planck (15 November 1751 – 31 August 1833) was a German theologian and church historian. He was the great-grandfather of physicist Max Planck.

Biography
Planck was born at Nürtingen in Württemberg, where his father was a notary. Educated for the Protestant ministry at Blaubeuren, Bebenhausen and Tübingen, he became a lecturer at Tübingen in 1774, a preacher at Stuttgart in 1780, and a professor of church history at the University of Göttingen in 1784.

At Tübingen he wrote Das Tagebuch eines neuen Ehemannes. In 1781 he published the first volume of Geschichte des protestantischen Lehrbegriffs (History of the Protestant teaching concept); the second volume appeared in 1783, and it was eventually completed in six volumes in 1800. It was followed by an extensive Geschichte der christlich-kirchlichen Gesellschaftsverfassung (History of the Christian church's social constitution) in five volumes (1803–1809).

He died in Göttingen on 31 August 1833. His son Heinrich Ludwig Planck (1785–1831), also professor of theology at Göttingen, published Bemerkungen über den ersten Paulinischen brief an den Timotheus (1808) and Abriss der philosophischen Religionslehre (1821).

References

Sources

1751 births
1833 deaths
People from Nürtingen
18th-century German Protestant theologians
19th-century German Protestant theologians
Academic staff of the University of Göttingen
University of Tübingen alumni
19th-century German historians
People from the Duchy of Württemberg
19th-century German male writers
19th-century German writers
German male non-fiction writers
18th-century German male writers
18th-century German historians